Paul Moore may refer to:

Paul Moore Sr. (1886–1959), American businessman
Paul Moore Jr. (1919–2003), bishop of the Episcopal Church
Paul Moore (banking manager) (1958–2020), banker and whistleblower from UK bank HBOS
Paul J. Moore (1868–1938), American politician
Bud Moore (racing driver) (1941–2017), American NASCAR driver
Paul Moore (soccer), Canadian soccer player 
Paul Moore (priest) (born 1959), Anglican archdeacon
Paul Moore (cricketer) (born 1961), Irish cricketer
Paul Moore (American football), American football player

See also
Paul Moer (1916–2010), American jazz pianist
Paul Moor (born 1978), English ten-pin bowler